Esther P. Golar (April 16, 1944 – September 21, 2015) was a Democratic member of the Illinois House of Representatives, representing the 6th District since her appointment in 2006. She served until her death on September 21, 2015.

Early life 
Born in Merigold, Mississippi, Golar moved with her family to Chicago, Illinois in 1950.  She went to Crane Technical High School and Malcolm X College. Before her appointment to the Illinois General Assembly, Golar worked as a civilian employee of the Chicago Alternative Policing Strategy. She was also a board secretary of the Neighborhood Housing Services for nine years.

State Representative 
Golar was appointed to her position as state representative after Patricia Bailey was forced to resign. Bailey was convicted for election fraud and perjury. Golar won election in her own right on November 7, 2006, and was thereafter reelected in 2008-2014 to successive terms in the Illinois House of Representatives.

As a member of the Illinois House of Representatives, Golar served on nine committees: Committee of the Whole; Appropriations-General Service; Judiciary II-Criminal Law; Child Support Enforcement; Tourism and Conventions; Veterans Affairs; Health Care Availability Access; Development Disabilities and Mental Illness; and Managing Sex Offender Issues. Her top issues were schools, crime, and healthcare. She lived in the New City community of Chicago from 1983 until her death. She was succeeded in the Illinois House by Sonya Harper.

References

External links
Representative Esther Golar (D) 6th District at the Illinois General Assembly
By sessions: 98th, 97th, 96th, 95th, 94th
 
Esther Golar at Illinois House Democrats

1944 births
2015 deaths
People from Bolivar County, Mississippi
Malcolm X College alumni
Democratic Party members of the Illinois House of Representatives
Politicians from Chicago
United Church of Christ members
Women state legislators in Illinois
21st-century American politicians
21st-century American women politicians